Powelliphanta rossiana, subspecies "Fox", known as one of the amber snails, is an as yet unnamed subspecies of large, carnivorous land snail, a terrestrial pulmonate gastropod mollusc in the family Rhytididae.

References

 Powell A. W. B., New Zealand Mollusca, William Collins Publishers Ltd, Auckland, New Zealand 1979 
 Department of Conservation Recovery Plans
 New Zealand Department of Conservation Threatened Species Classification

Gastropods of New Zealand
Powelliphanta
Undescribed gastropod species
Subspecies
Endemic fauna of New Zealand
Endemic molluscs of New Zealand